Within the country of Myanmar, Ban Mai Nai Soi refugee camp is a refugee camp which was established in Karenni State in 1989, and had an estimated refugee population of 19,512 in 2008.

Established in 1989 in Karenni State, Burma, the camp has moved many times, finally relocating to its current position in Pang Moo Sub-district, Muang District, Mae Hong Son Province, in 1996. Sections of the camp have been attacked by Burmese forces in 1996 and 1998. Shelling by Burmese forces and their allies caused one death and several injuries in 1997.
 
The population is 94% Karenni and 3% Karen among others.

References

External links
 http://www.darenetwork.com/dare_map.swf

Mae Hong Son
Refugee camps in Thailand
Karen refugee camps
Buildings and structures in Mae Hong Son province
Populated places established in 1989
1989 establishments in Myanmar